Lunacy is a 2005 Czech film by Jan Švankmajer. The film is loosely based on two short stories, "The System of Doctor Tarr and Professor Fether" (1845) and "The Premature Burial" (1844), by Edgar Allan Poe. It is also partly inspired by the works of the Marquis de Sade. The film was shot between October 2004 and April 2005, on location in the village of Peruc close to Prague, and in Švankmajer's studio in the village of Knovíz.

Plot summary
Jean Berlot (Liska) is a deeply troubled man who has been haunted by violent hallucinations of being stuffed into a straitjacket by two orderlies since the death of his mother, who was committed to a mental institution before she passed on. While arranging his mother's funeral, Jean meets a fellow who claims to be the Marquis de Sade (Triska) and lives as if he is in 18th-century France rather than the 21st-century Czech Republic. Jean strikes up an alliance with the Marquis, though they can hardly be called friends, but is horrified by the Marquis' debauchery, namely the blasphemous orgy that Jean spies through an open window. The Marquis drops dead after choking on a banana the following day, and Jean is ordered at gunpoint to assist the servant Dominik (Nový) in burying the coffin in the family mausoleum. The next morning Jean and Dominik are awakened by a bell, and after opening the stone of the mausoleum, the Marquis reveals it had all been an elaborate prank. His mother had died after being buried alive, and he finds it therapeutic to relive this childhood memory that haunts him.

The Marquis suggests a therapy that could help with Jean's nightmares: voluntarily committing himself to an asylum managed by his friend Dr. Murlloppe (Dusek), who offers "Purgative Therapy" for people who are not mad but could be in the future. Jean falls for a beautiful nurse named Charlota (Geislerova), who claims she is being held at the hospital against her will, and reveals that Murlloppe and the Marquis were previous patients who led a revolt and locked the real asylum employees in the basement. The Marquis tells Jean that Charlota is a "nymphomaniac" and likes to tell complex fabricated stories as a form of foreplay. On the one year anniversary of their revolt, Murlloppe, the Marquis, and Dominik take Charlota with them for a ritual orgy, and Charlota tells Jean it is his only chance to free the staff. Jean finds them tarred and feathered in the basement, and releases the men, who waste no time in beating all the patients and shoving them back into their cells. Dr. Coulmiere thanks Jean for releasing them, and explains his philosophy that corporal punishment is key to treating mental illness by balancing the mind and the body, and that Murlloppe's idea of curing it with "freedom" is absurd. Murlloppe, the Marquis, and Dominik are tracked down and are each given severe punishments. Now that Charlota has been rescued, Jean expects to leave with her and get married, but Dr. Coulmiere will not permit Jean to leave until 8am, per the usual protocol. Jean has trouble sleeping, and seeks out Charlota for comfort, but her room is empty. He finds her in Dr. Coulmiere's room preparing for a night of sexual pleasures. This sets off one of his violent hallucinations, and Dr. Coulmiere eventually has to intervene. He orders the first round of corporal punishment treatment: two orderlies stuff Jean into a straitjacket and carry him away.

Cast 
 Jan Tříska	...	Marquis
 Pavel Liška	...	Jean Berlot
 Anna Geislerová	...	Charlota
 Martin Huba	...	Dr. Coulmiere
 Jaroslav Dušek	...	Dr. Murlloppe
 Pavel Nový	...	Servant Dominik
 Stano Danciak	...	Innkeeper
 Jiří Krytinář	...	Reciting Madman
 Katerina Růžičková	...	Asylum inmate
 Iva Littmanová	...	Asylum inmate
 Kateřina Valachová	...	Asylum inmate
 Josef Kašpar	...	Insane erotomaniac
 Miroslav Navrátil	...	Dream warden
 Jirí Maria Sieber	...	Dream warden
 Ctirad Götz	...	Ostler

Box office 
The film grossed $48,324 in the US and $85,658 from foreign markets for a grand total of $133,982.

References

External links
Lunacy at Metacritic
 
 

2005 films
Czech animated films
2000s Czech-language films
Films based on works by Edgar Allan Poe
Films based on works by the Marquis de Sade
Films directed by Jan Švankmajer
Films with live action and animation
2000s stop-motion animated films
Czech horror films
Films based on multiple works
Films based on short fiction
Surrealist films
Czech Lion Awards winners (films)
Sun in a Net Awards winners (films)
Slovak animated films
Slovak horror films
Czech animated horror films
Czech adult animated films